Logan House may refer to:

in the United States (by state then city)
Logan House (Wilmington, Delaware), listed on the National Register of Historic Places (NRHP)
Thomas E. Logan House, Boise, Idaho, listed on the NRHP in Ada County
W. W. Logan House, Bedford, Kentucky, listed on the NRHP in Lincoln County 
Logan House (Finchville, Kentucky), listed on the NRHP in Shelby County
John Logan House, Stanford, Kentucky, listed on the NRHP in Lincoln County
Logan House (403 E. Fourth Street, Carthage, Missouri), nominated for listing in the NRHP in Jasper County
Logan House (509 E. Chestnut, Carthage, Missouri), nominated for listing on the NRHP in Jasper County
Logan, John Sublett Jr. and Caroline Ashton House, Saint Joseph, Missouri, listed on the NRHP in Buchanan County
The Logan (Omaha, Nebraska), listed on the NRHP in Douglas County
George W. Logan House, Rutherfordton, North Carolina, listed on the NRHP in Rutherford County
Leonard M. Logan House, Tahlequah, Oklahoma, listed on the NRHP in Cherokee County
Logan House Hotel, Altoona, Pennsylvania, an historic hotel and site of the Loyal War Governors Conference. 
Logan House (Dillsburg, Pennsylvania)
Ratcliffe-Logan-Allison House, Fairfax, Virginia, listed on the NRHP